Armina maculata is a species of sea slug, a nudibranch, a marine gastropod mollusk in the family Arminidae.

Description

The mantle is colored bright orange, and is uniformly covered with white bumps. Individuals can be found up to 15cm.

Distribution
This species occurs in European waters and the Mediterranean Sea. It has often been observed feeding on the sea pen Veretillum cynomorium.

References 

 Sea Slug Forum info
 Gofas, S.; Le Renard, J.; Bouchet, P. (2001). Mollusca, in: Costello, M.J. et al. (Ed.) (2001). European register of marine species: a check-list of the marine species in Europe and a bibliography of guides to their identification. Collection Patrimoines Naturels, 50: pp. 180–213

Arminidae
Gastropods described in 1814
Taxa named by Constantine Samuel Rafinesque